Hervé (Ervevios or Erbebios), called Frankopoulos or Phrangopoulos ("Son of the Frank"), was a Norman mercenary general in Byzantine service during the 1050s.

Biography 
According to Amatus of Montecassino, Hervé and other Norman mercenaries fought for the Byzantine Empire under George Maniakes against the Muslims in Sicily from 1038 to 1040. Between 1040 and 1043, he took part in the campaign against the Greeks of Apulia and received the city of Avellino (1042/3). At about 1050, he appears as the leader of the Norman mercenaries under Nikephoros Bryennios the Elder and one of the Greek's two chief lieutenants. In the same year, he and Katakalon Kekaumenos were defeated by the Pechenegs near the Danube.

In 1056, he demanded the high court title of magistros from Emperor Michael VI Stratiotikos (r. 1056–1057). Refused, he withdrew to his estate in the Armeniac theme. From there, he gathered a following of 300 Normans, and in the spring of 1057 he marched into eastern Asia Minor, around Lake Van. There, he possibly aimed to set up a state for himself and entered into wars with the Armenians and the Seljuk Turks. After initial success, he was captured by a ruse by the emir of Ahlat, Abu Nasr. 

Hervé was shipped back to Constantinople in chains, but there he was apparently reconciled to the Byzantine emperor: a surviving seal records his having received the title of magistros, and the positions of vestiarites and stratelates of the East in the army of Emperor Isaac I Komnenos (r. 1057–1059). Around 1063, however, Matthew of Edessa records that the Turks of Amida bribed a certain "Frankabol", to avoid battle. Whether this was indeed Hervé is uncertain, but he was executed by Emperor Constantine X Doukas (r. 1059–1067) shortly afterwards.

He was possibly the founder of the late Byzantine Phrangopoulos family.



References

Sources

Further reading

External links
Prosopography of the Byzantine World: Hervé Phrangopoulos/Frankopoulos

11th-century Byzantine military personnel
11th-century executions by the Byzantine Empire
11th-century Byzantine people
11th-century births
1060s deaths
Year of birth unknown
Year of death uncertain
Byzantine generals
Byzantine mercenaries
Byzantine rebels
Italo-Normans
Norman mercenaries
Norman warriors